Tyler Hogan (born 11 July 1998) is an Australian curler who represented Australia in the 2015 Pacific-Asia Junior Curling Championships as well as the 2016 World Junior B Curling Championships.

References

Australian male curlers
1998 births
Living people
Sportspeople from Sydney